Tomasz Tymosiak (born 19 March 1993) is a Polish professional footballer who plays as a midfielder for II liga club Garbarnia Kraków.

Career
Tymosiak began his career at Górnik Łęczna. On 17 March 2012, he made his debut in professional football as a part of the Bogdanka Łęczna squad. In July 2015, he moved to III liga side Motor Lublin. On 30 June 2016, he signed a new one-year contract with Motor.

On 29 June 2018, Tymosiak signed for Górnik Łęczna.

References

External links
 

1993 births
Living people
Sportspeople from Lublin
Polish footballers
Association football midfielders
Górnik Łęczna players
Motor Lublin players
OKS Stomil Olsztyn players
KS Lublinianka players
Garbarnia Kraków players
Ekstraklasa players
I liga players
II liga players
III liga players